The canton of Fourchambault is an administrative division of the Nièvre department, central France. It was created at the French canton reorganisation which came into effect in March 2015. Its seat is in Fourchambault.

It consists of the following communes:
Fourchambault
Garchizy
Germigny-sur-Loire
Marzy

References

Cantons of Nièvre